Pierre Billon may refer to:
 Pierre Billon (writer) (born 1937), Canadian novelist and screenwriter
 Pierre Billon (director) (1901–1981), French film director and screenwriter